is a railway station on the Jōhana Line in city of Nanto, Toyama, Japan, operated by West Japan Railway Company (JR West).

Lines

Layout
The station has a two opposed ground-level side platforms serving one two tracks, connected to the wooden station building by a wooden footbridge. The station has a Midori no Madoguchi staffed ticket office.

Platforms

Adjacent stations

History
The station opened on 4 May 1897. With the privatization of Japanese National Railways (JNR) on 1 April 1987, the station came under the control of JR West.

Passenger statistics
In fiscal 2015, the station was used by an average of 734 passengers daily (boarding passengers only).

Surrounding area
 Nanto City Hall
 Fukuno Junior High School

See also
 List of railway stations in Japan

References

External links

 

Railway stations in Toyama Prefecture
Stations of West Japan Railway Company
Railway stations in Japan opened in 1897
Jōhana Line
Nanto, Toyama